Comrade Anand Patwardhan (born 18 February 1950) is an Indian documentary filmmaker known for his socio-political, human rights-oriented films. Some of his films explore the rise of religious fundamentalism, sectarianism and casteism in India, while others investigate nuclear nationalism and unsustainable development. Notable films include Bombay: Our City (Hamara Shahar) (1985), In Memory of Friends (1990), In the Name of God (Ram ke Nam) (1992), Father, Son, and Holy War (1995), A Narmada Diary (1995), War and Peace (2002) and Jai Bhim Comrade (2011), and Reason (2018) which have won national and international awards.

Biography

Patwardhan was born on 18 February 1950, in Mumbai, Maharashtra. He completed a B.A. in English literature at Mumbai University in 1970, a Bachelor of Arts in Sociology at Brandeis University in 1972, and a Master of Arts in Communication Studies at McGill University in 1982. He is a member of the Oscar Academy.

Films

Virtually all of Patwardhan's documentary films have faced censorship from the Indian government, eventually being cleared after legal action. His film Bombay: Our City was shown on TV after a four-year court case, while Father, Son, and Holy War (1995) was adjudged in 2004 as one of 50 most memorable international documentaries of all time by DOX, Europe's leading documentary film magazine. Father, Son, and Holy War was shown on India's National Network, Doordarshan, only in the year 2006, 11 years after its making, after a prolonged court battle which lasted ten years and ended with the nation's Supreme Court ordering the network to telecast the film without any cuts.

The Central Board of Film Certification (CBFC), refused to certify his next film, War and Peace, released in 2002. The board demanded 21 cuts before it would be certified. Patwardhan took the government to court, leading to the film being banned for over a year. However, after a court battle, Patwardhan won the right to screen his film without a single cut.  As with his previous films, Patwardhan also successfully fought to force a reluctant national broadcaster, Doordarshan, to show this film on their national network. It was commercially released in multiplexes in 2005.

His 2011 documentary, Jai Bhim Comrade, was based on a police firing incident against Dalits at Ramabai Colony in Mumbai in 1997. The film, which took 14 years to complete, is considered by many to be a watershed in Patwardhan's long career. In 2013 the Sheffield International Film Festival honoured Patwardhan with an Inspiration Award. In 2014 the Mumbai International Film Festival honoured him with the V. Shantaram Lifetime Achievement Award.

Upon being asked in a BFI interview to deliver a message for future documentary filmmakers, Patwardhan famously replied, "No message really. Do it only if it burns when you don't."

Filmography
 1971: "Waves of Revolution" (Kraanti Ki Tarangein): This film was on government repression in Bihar Movement.
 1978: "Prisoners of Conscience" (Zameer ke Bandi): a film on political prisoners in The Emergency (India)
 The Tyne Award, Tyneside Festival, UK, 1982.
 1981: "A Time to Rise" (Uthan da Vela)]: Concerns Indian immigrant farm workers' efforts to unionise in Canada.
 Grand Prize: Tyneside International Film Festival, UK in 1982
 Silver Dove: Leipzig International Film Festival in 1982.
 1985: "Bombay: Our City" (Hamara Shahar): Everyday survival issues of slum dwellers in Bombay.
 National Film Award for Best Non-Feature Film 1986
 Special Jury Award, Cinema du reel, France, 1986
 Filmfare Award for Best Documentary, 1986
 1990: 'In Memory of Friends' (Una Mitran Di Yaad Pyaari): On rebuilding communal harmony in Punjab.
 National Film Award for Best Investigative Film, 1990
  Silver Conch, Mumbai International Film Festival in 1990 Anand Patwardhan Films.
 Special Jury Award, Mannheim International Film festival, 1990
 1992: "In the Name of God" (Ram ke Nam): On the rise of Hindu Nationalism and the demolition of the Babri Mosque.
 National Film Award for Best Investigative Film, 1992
 Filmfare Award for Best Documentary, 1996
 Best Documentary Film at Fribourg International Film Festival, 1993
 Citizen's Prize, Yamagata International Documentary Film Festival, 1993.
 1993: We are not your Monkeys: A Dalit critique of the epic Ramayana through a music video.
 1995: Father, Son, and Holy War
 National Film Award for Best Film on Social Issues and National Film Award for Best Investigative Film, 1996
 Toronto Film Festival, 1994
 Special Jury Prize, Vancouver Film Festival, 1994
 Special Jury Award, Yamagata International Documentary Film Festival, 1995
 Grand Prize, Jerusalem International Film Festival, 1996.
 Audience Award, Sheffield International Film Festival, 2010
 1996: A Narmada Diary : Introduces the Narmada Bachao Andolan of Gujarat.
 Grand Prize at the Earth Vision Film Festival in 1996.
 Filmfare Award for Best Documentary 1996.
 1996: Occupation: Mill Worker: Chronicles the actions of mill workers who, after a four-year lock-out, forcibly occupied The New Great Eastern Mill in India.
 1998: Fishing: In the Sea of Greed: Response of fishing communities in India and Bangladesh, to industrial-scale fishing.
 1998: Ribbons for Peace: An anti-nuke music video.
 2002: War and Peace
 Grand Prize at the Earth Vision Film Festival in 2002
 Best Film at Mumbai International Film Festival in 2002
 FIPRESCI International Critics' Award at Sydney Film Festival in 2002
 Best Documentary in Karachi International Film Festival in 2003
 National Film Award for Best Non-Feature Film, India, 2004, etc.
 2006: Images You Didn't See: Music video that interprets images gleaned from the net-images that either never appear in the mainstream media, or images whose import are masked behind a velvet curtain of global infotainment.
 2009: Children of Mandala: A message from the economically displaced children of a slum colony in Mumbai.
 2011: Jai Bhim Comrade: a documentary film based on a real incident – the killing of 10 Dalits by police in Mumbai, 1997.
 Ram Bahadur Grand Prize, Film South Asia, Kathmandu, Nepal, 2011
 Best Film/Video, Mumbai International Film Festival, India, 2012
 Firebird Award for Best documentary, Hong Kong Film Festival, 2012
 Special Jury Prize, National Film Awards, India, 2012
 Bartok Prize, Jean Rouch Film International Film Festival, 2012
 2018: Reason / Vivek: the war between faith and rationality. An eight-part documentary.
 IDFA Award for best feature-length documentary, 2018
Audience Award at the Indian Film Festival of Los Angeles, 2019

References

External links

Websites on Anand Patwardhan's work
 Opinion: Anand Patwardhan – Nation's Conscience-Keeper
 Anand Patwardhan Website
  Anand Patwardhan at the Internet Movie Database
 The Films of Anand Patwardhan
 Anand Patwardhan materials in the South Asian American Digital Archive (SAADA)

Interviews
 Anand Patwardhan interviewed by Chandana Mathur for SAMAR Magazine, Winter 1992  
 Kathleen Maclay, "Anand Patwardhan, the 'Michael Moore of India,' brings his hard-hitting documentary films to campus", UB Berkeley News, 13 October 2004
 Director's Interview - BBC interview
 All the dire predictions of communal carnage made in my film came true
 Interview: Firebrand filmmaker Anand Patwardhan CNNGO Website
 Firebrand filmmaker Anand Patwardhan - Coalition for Nuclear Disarmament and Peace Website
 Filmmaker as activist - The Hindu
 Battling the bomb - Montreal Mirror
 Of The 200 Killed In Mumbai, A High Number Were Muslims - Tehelka Interview, 2008

Writings
 Monkey Business: Cross Currents Website
 The Good Doctor of Chhattisgarh - Association for India's Development Website
 
 Destruction of Buddhist monuments in Afghanistan and the Babri Masjid

Reviews
 Ammu Joseph, "Censoring peace amid nuclear 'deterrence'", August 2002 - Tehelka
 Short is Sweet - Tehelka
 
 Elvis Mitchell, "FILM REVIEW; Weapons of Mass Pride: India's Nuclear Embrace", The New York Times, 26 June 2003

Video clips
 War and Peace Video Clip - Ekta Online
War and Peace on YouTube
 
 
 
 
Vivek-Reason on YouTube

 
20th-century Indian film directors
1950 births
Activists from Maharashtra
Brandeis University alumni
Film directors from Mumbai
Indian anti–nuclear weapons activists
Indian civil rights activists
Indian documentary filmmakers
Living people
Marathi people
McGill University alumni
University of Mumbai alumni